King Stingray is the debut studio album from Australian rock group, King Stingray. It was released on 5 August 2022 and debuted at number 6 on the ARIA Charts.

Music Feeds said, "Their music combines classic and contemporary rock influences with the ancient tradition of manikay (song/songlines), which dates back tens of thousands of years."

At the 2022 ARIA Music Awards, the album was nominated for Album of the Year, Best Group, Best Rock Album, Breakthrough Artist – Release and Best Cover Art.

The album won the 2022 Australian Music Prize, and was nominated for Australian Album of the Year at the 2022 J Awards.

Critical reception

Andrew Stafford from The Guardian called the album "irresistibly joyful" saying "With Yothu Yindi in their bloodlines, the band have delivered a hooky and uptempo first album with a sound that's all their own."

James Di Fabrizio from Rolling Stone Australia said "King Stingray may be one of the most exciting rock bands to emerge from this country in a generation." Di Fabrizio added "Each track is a heady exploration of rhythm, psych and storytelling [and] come together like puzzle pieces, showcasing the beauty and community of the place they call home — the incomparable Arnhem Land." 

Al Newstead from Triple J said it "feels like an instant Australian classic", saying "perfectly fusing contemporary rock with Yolŋu manikay, King Stingray's fun, spirited first album is a captivating ode to country and community." The album topped the Double J 50 best albums of the year list.

Track listing

Charts

Release history

References

2022 debut albums
ARIA Award-winning albums